The 2012 All-Ireland Senior Camogie Championship Final was the eighty-first All-Ireland Final and the deciding match of the 2012 All-Ireland Senior Camogie Championship, an inter-county camogie tournament for the top teams in Ireland.

Wexford won by seven points.

References

Camogie
All-Ireland Senior Camogie Championship Final
All-Ireland Senior Camogie Championship Final, 2012
All-Ireland Senior Camogie Championship Finals